Mouriscas is a Portuguese freguesia ("civil parish"), located in Abrantes Municipality, in Santarém District. The population in 2011 was 1,832, in an area of 35.02 km². The parish stands in the north bank of the Tagus River and borders the parishes of Concavada, Pego and Alferrarede. It also borders the Mação Municipality and Sardoal Municipality.

References

Freguesias of Abrantes